Taloja is a census town in Raigad district of Navi Mumbai city in the Indian state of Maharashtra. It is an extension of the Kharghar node and governed by Panvel Municipal Corporation. Taloja has Navi Mumbai Metro Phase I starting origin point at Pendhar. Taloja is divided into two phases as Phase I and Phase II by CIDCO.

Demographics
 India census, Taloje Panchnand had a population of 10,858. Males constitute 54% of the population and females 46%. Taloje Panchnand has an average literacy rate of 68%, higher than the national average of 59.5%: male literacy is 73%, and female literacy is 61%. In Taloje Panchnand, 18% of the population is under 6 years of age.

See also
Taloja Panchnand railway station
Taloja Central Jail

References

Cities and towns in Raigad district
https://cidco.maharashtra.gov.in/pdf/nodal/kharghar.pdf